Brewster may refer to:

People
Brewster (surname)
Brewster Kahle (born 1960), American computer technologist
Brewster H. Shaw (born 1945), American astronaut

Places
Brewster Park (Enniskillen), Northern Ireland
Brewster (crater), The Moon

United States
Brewster, Florida
Brewster, Kansas
Brewster, Massachusetts
Brewster (CDP), Massachusetts
Brewster, Minnesota
Brewster, Nebraska
Brewster, New York
Brewster (Metro-North station)
Brewster Hill, New York
Brewster, Ohio
Brewster, Washington
Brewster County, Texas
Brewster Creek, in Akron, Ohio

Islands in Boston Harbor
Great Brewster Island
Little Brewster Island
Middle Brewster Island

Structures
Brewster-Douglass Housing Projects, in Detroit, Michigan, USA
Brewster Hospital, in Duval County, Florida, USA

Schools
Brewster Academy, a boarding school in New Hampshire, USA
Brewster High School (Brewster, Washington), USA
Brewster School District (disambiguation), several

Business
Brewster & Co., American coachbuilders and automobile maker and a brand of automobile
Brewster Aeronautical Corporation, the aircraft manufacturing division
Brewster F2A Buffalo, an American fighter aircraft which saw limited service early in World War II
Brewster Jennings & Associates, a front company set up by the CIA
Crocker & Brewster, publishing house in Boston, USA

Science
Brewster's angle, a physics concept
Brewster (unit), a unit of measure named after David Brewster
Edinburgh Encyclopædia, 1808–1830 publication edited by David Brewster

Entertainment
Brewster McCloud, a 1970 film
Brewster's Millions, 1902 novel
Brewster's Millions (1985 film)
Brewster Rockit: Space Guy!, a comic strip
Punky Brewster, a TV program
 Brewster the Guru, a minor character on The Muppet Show
 Brewster, one of the protagonists on Chuggington

Other uses
Brewster Chair, a style of chair formerly made in New England
Brewster Color, a color film system
Brewster Body Shield, a prototype World War I body armor
Brewster (police dog), (2004-2017), the longest serving police dog in Britain

See also
 Brewer (disambiguation)